KIQN (KIQ'N Country 103.3) is a radio station licensed to Colorado City, Colorado, and serving the Pueblo and Colorado Springs areas with a country music format. KIQN is owned by Pueblo Broadcasting Group, LLC.

History
103.3 FM flipped from its Rhythmic AC format on May 31, 2012 by stunting with a Polka format for seven days before settling into a high-energy Rhythmic Top 40 format, offering a hybrid mix of currents, old school and Dance hits, the latter being heavily dayparted in evenings. The evening block of programming is branded as "Radio Planeta" and features a bilingual English/Spanish combination of dance music.

According to station owner Steven R Bartholomew, "This station represents music with energy!"

KIQN has been granted a construction permit to move to 103.1 FM.

On September 1, 2015, the then-KJQY changed their format to country, branded as "KIQ'N Country". The station changed its call sign to the current KIQN on November 23, 2015.

References

External links

IQN
Country radio stations in the United States
Radio stations established in 2011
2011 establishments in Colorado